Ngukurr Airport  is located in Roper River, Northern Territory, Australia, adjacent to the remote Aboriginal community of Ngukurr.

Airlines and destinations

See also
 List of airports in the Northern Territory

References

External links
 

Airports in the Northern Territory